Nurses in the United States practice nursing in a wide variety of specialties and departments.

Types of nurses
Nursing in the United States is provided by several levels of professional and paraprofessional staff.

Education
Registered nurses generally receive their basic preparation through one of four basic avenues:
 Diploma in Nursing: Graduation with a three-year certificate from a hospital-based school of nursing. Few of these programs remain in the U.S. and the proportion of nurses practicing with a diploma is rapidly decreasing.
 Associate of Science in Nursing: Graduation from a degree-granting nursing program conferring the degree of ASN/AAS or ADN in nursing.  This involves two to three years of college level study with a strong emphasis on clinical knowledge and skills.
 Bachelor of Science in Nursing: Graduation from a university, from a four- or five-year program conferring the BSN or BN degree with enhanced emphasis on leadership and research as well as clinically focused courses.
 Generic-entry Master of Science in Nursing: Graduation from a university, one to three-year program conferring the MS/MSN degree with emphasis on leadership and research as well as clinically focused courses for students who hold a bachelor's degree or higher in an academic field other than nursing.

There are also special programs for "LPN to RN", for LPNs seeking an RN degree. There are also accelerated baccalaureate nursing programs that take 1.5 to 2 years for people who hold undergraduate degrees in other disciplines, such as respiratory therapists and paramedics/military medics.  Graduates of all programs, once licensed, are eligible for employment as entry-level staff nurses.

Prerequisites for nursing school depend on the school, with baccalaureate programs requiring more courses, in general, than associate degree programs. Usual courses include three years of math, three years of science, including biology and chemistry, four years of English and two years of language. Additionally, human development, human anatomy with lab, human physiology with lab, microbiology with lab, nutritional science and English composition may be required.
Applicants are usually expected to have a high grade point average, especially in the core prerequisites of anatomy, microbiology, chemistry and physiology.

A typical course of study at any level typically includes such topics as, anatomy and physiology, epidemiology, pharmacology and medication administration, psychology, ethics, nursing theory and legal issues in nursing.

All pathways into practice require that the candidate receive clinical training in nursing.  Care is delivered by the student nurses under academic supervision in hospital and in other practice settings.  Clinical courses typically include:
 Maternal-child nursing.
 Pediatric nursing.
 Adult medical-surgical nursing.
 Geriatric nursing.
 Psychiatric nursing.

While in clinical training, student nurses are identified by a special uniform to distinguish them from licensed professionals.

In many nursing programs in the United States, a computerized exam is given before, during, and upon completion to evaluate the student and nursing program outcomes. This exam, upon completion of the nursing program, measures a student's readiness for the NCLEX-RN or NCLEX-PN state board licensure exam. The exam identifies strengths and weaknesses and areas for remediation prior to taking the state board exam. This is not a requirement of all nursing programs in the United States, but has increased its usage in the past three to four years.

It is common for RNs to seek additional education to earn a Master of Science in Nursing or Doctor of Nursing Science to prepare for leadership or advanced practice roles within nursing. Management and teaching positions increasingly require candidates to hold an advanced degree in nursing. Many hospitals offer tuition reimbursement or assistance to nurses who want to continue their education beyond their basic preparation.

Many nurses pursue voluntary specialty  certification through professional organizations and certifying bodies in order to demonstrate advanced knowledge and skills in their area of expertise.

Most U.S. states and territories require RNs to graduate from an accredited nursing program which allows the candidate to sit for the NCLEX-RN, a standardized examination administered through the National Council of State Nursing Boards. Successful completion of the NCLEX-RN is required for state licensure as an RN.

Nurses from other countries are required to be proficient in English and have their educational credentials evaluated by an association known as the Commission on Graduates of Foreign Nursing Schools prior to being permitted to take the U.S. licensing exam.

Legal regulation
Government regulates the profession of nursing to protect the public.

The individual states have authority over nursing practice.  The scope of practice is defined by state laws and by regulations administered by State Nursing Boards.

Many states have adopted the Model Nursing Practice Act and Model Nursing Administrative Rules created by the National Council of State Nursing Boards (NCSNB).   In addition, many state nursing boards model their licensure requirements on the Uniform Core Licensure Requirements which set forth competency development and competency assessment principles.

Nurses may be licensed in more than one state, either by examination or endorsement of a license issued by another state. In addition, the states which have adopted the Nurse Licensure Compact allow nurses licensed in one of the states to practice in all of them through mutual recognition of licensure.

Licenses must be periodically renewed. Some states require continuing education in order to renew licenses.

Demand for nurses in the US
The demand for nurses has been on the rise for several years, spurred by various economic and demographic factors. Demand for nurses is projected to increase for the foreseeable future (an increase of 23% between 2006 and 2016, according to the US Department of Labor). Candidates for nursing jobs that are in highest demand include registered nurses, licensed practical nurses, certified nurse assistants, and certified medical assistants.

As nurses endure long work hours, they face the struggles of being understaffed. These insufficient ratios of staff create a more stressful environment, discouraging some nurses to remain in their profession. By either increasing the number of staff or the quality of the staff's training, there could be fewer barriers for aspiring nurses to surpass.

The Department of Labor's estimated increase percentage per nurse employer type is:
 25% - Offices of physicians
 23% - Home health care services
 34% - Outpatient care centers, except mental health and substance abuse
 33% - Employment services
 23% - General medical and surgical hospitals, public and private
 23% - Nursing care facilities

See also 
 List of nursing schools in the United States
 History of nursing in the United States

References